This is a list of United States Marine Corps divisions.

Active

See also

 United States Marine Corps Judge Advocate Division
 List of United States Marine Corps aircraft wings
 List of United States Marine Corps logistics groups
 List of 1st Marine Division Commanders
 List of 2nd Marine Division Commanders
 List of 3rd Marine Division Commanders

Divisions

United States Marine Corps